Natacha Aguilar de Soto  is a Spanish marine biologist at the University of La Laguna (ULL), Tenerife, Canary Islands.  She is a Ramón y Cajal research and teaching fellow at ULL and has been a Marie Skłodowska-Curie Research Fellow at ULL and at the Center for Research in Ecological Modeling (CREEM) of the University of St. Andrews (SMRU). She is the director of cetacean research within ULL's BIOECOMAC (Grupo de Investigación en Biodiversidad, Ecología Marina y Conservación).

Aguilar de Soto studies the diving behavior of deep-sea cetaceans including beaked whales and pilot whales. Her research on the short-finned pilot whale is causing scientists to reassess foraging models for the behavior of marine predators.
She leads research on bioacoustics, acoustic ecology, and the effects of noise disturbance on cetaceans, which is influencing human management
policies.
Aguilar de Soto is the president and co-founder of the Asociación GIC (Grupo de Investigación de Cetáceos), and a founder of CETAVIST, the Cetacean and Seabird Sighting Network of the Canary Islands.

Career
Natacha Aguilar de Soto has a doctorate in Biology from the  University of La Laguna  (Universidad de La Laguna, ULL) in Tenerife, Canary Islands. 
Aguilar de Soto joined the University of La Laguna as a student, began a long-term research study observing Blainville´s and Cuvier´s beaked whales in 2002 and published her Ph.D. work in 2006. As a member of the BIOECOMAC (Biodiversity, Marine Ecology and Conservation) research group at ULL she is the director of research on cetaceans and bioacoustics.

Aguilar de Soto was the project manager of the SOUNDMAR project (2010–2013) at ULL, under a Marie Skłodowska-Curie Action funded by the European Union.
She was the project manager of the ECOSOUND project (2015–2017) at the Center for Research in Ecological Modeling (CREEM) of the University of St. Andrews (SMRU) also funded through a Marie Skłodowska-Curie Action from the European Union, as part of the Horizon 2020 initiative.
Aguilar de Soto became the Ramón y Cajal fellow at ULL in 2017.

She is the president and co-founder of the Asociación GIC (Grupo de Investigación de Cetáceos), 
which was established in 2003 for the study, conservation and protection of marine mammals in the Canary Islands region.

She is a founder of CETAVIST, the Cetacean and Seabird Sighting Network of the Canary Islands,  which was organized in 2012 to involve citizen scientists. Volunteers observers for CETAVIST travel on passenger ferries. Between December 2012 and October 2016, they carried out 1,300 surveys of cetaceans and seabirds. The work received support from the Fundación Biodiversidad – MAGRAMA, and its records are made publicly available through the database www.aviste.me.

Aguilar de Soto has participated in expert groups examining the impact of marine noise, including  ACCOBAMS (Agreement on the Conservation of Cetaceans of the Black Sea, Mediterranean Sea and Contiguous Atlantic Area), ASCOBANS (Agreement on the Conservation of Small Cetaceans of the Baltic, North East Atlantic, Irish and North Seas), and OSPAR (Convention for the Protection of the Marine Environment of the North-East Atlantic). She has participated in population density estimates for Ireland and Scotland and in mitigation initiatives for the Canary Islands
New Zealand, 
Australia, and others.
In 2019, Aguilar de Soto was named a "Hope Spot Champion" as part of a campaign to make Tenerife-La Gomera a "Hope Spot" at the center of an enlarged marine protected area.

Research
Aguilar de Soto's research covers various fields, such as diving and feeding behavior,  ecology and acoustic communication of deep-diving cetacean species, distribution and abundance estimates of cetaceans and seabirds, and human impact on the marine environment, especially noise pollution and cetacean collisions with boats.

The Canary Islands provide a home to at least twenty-six species of cetaceans, including Blainville's beaked whale (Mesoplodon densirostris), True's beaked whale (Mesoplodon mirus), Gervais's beaked whale (Mesoplodon europaeus), Cuvier's beaked whale (Ziphius cavirostris), and northern bottlenose whale (Hyperoodon ampullatus). At least five species maintain a year-round presence in the archipelago, the only place in the North Atlantic where they are known to do so. 
Between 1985 and 2003, at least seven mass stranding events in the area involved beaked whales at the same time that naval exercises were being carried out. 
In 2004, a moratorium on the use of naval sonar within  of the Canary Islands was established by the Spanish Ministry of Defense, an action in accordance with resolutions by ACCOBAMS and others.

In 2003 Aguilar de Soto began a long-term research study observing Blainville´s and Cuvier´s beaked whales in the waters off El Hierro (Canary Islands). Researchers carried out seasonal monitoring of cetaceans using non-invasive DTAGs, developed at Woods Hole Oceanographic Institution (WHOI). The tags attach using suction cups which eventually fall off. They record sound and motion and transmit data back to researchers. The objective of this work was to better understand the behavior, social structure and population distribution of beaked whales.

Aguilar de Soto's Ph.D. thesis addressed Acoustic and diving behaviour of the short finned pilot whales (Globicephala macrorhynchus) and Blainville's beaked whale (Mesoplodon densirostris) off the Canary Islands. Implications on the effects of man-made noise and boat collisions (trans., 2006). The combination of recorded whale "clicks" and "buzzes" with speed, orientation, and depth data from the DTAGs revealed an unsuspected picture of how the whales hunt.  Described in the Journal of Animal Ecology (2008), pilot whales make high-speed dives to pursue large deep-dwelling prey and then return to the surface to breathe and rest.
The amount of energy involved in such sprints is far greater than a minimum cost. This research indicates that marine ecologists must address use of three-dimensional space, prey field distribution and the metabolism of energy expenditure as factors in models of marine foraging.
Aguilar de Soto's research on these “cheetahs of the deep sea” is causing scientists to rethink  their understanding of diving and feeding behaviors. It may influence policies for the management of whale-watching and shipping.

With the R.V. Cornide de Saavedra, Aguilar de Soto helped to evaluate the effects of a submarine volcanic eruption off El Hierro Island, occurring from 10 October 2011 to 5 March 2012.

Also in 2012, Aguilar de Soto co-authored an article in Marine Mammal Science discussing the acoustic camouflage of Blainville's beaked whales. Vocalizations consistent with echolocation and communication occur only in the latter part of descents and the deepest phase of dives, in which social group members synchronize their movement.

 
With Andrea Fais and other researchers from multiple international centers, Aguilar de Soto  carried out a complete acoustic sampling of sperm whales, in the deep waters off the Canary Islands. After covering an area of   along   of acoustic line-transects, the scientists estimated that the current population of sperm whales in Canary waters was around 224 individuals.  They compared that data with strandings involved in collisions with ships.  Data from the CetAVist project between 2012 and 2015 indicated that the Canary Islands is one of the places in the world with the most records of stranding of cetaceans due to collision with ships. In addition, the study highlighted that the mortality of sperm whales due to collisions may exceed the natural growth capacity of the species in the archipelago, leading to a decline in population.
As a result of this study, a number of steps were recommended to address this issue. Some recommendations have been implemented, such as the inclusion of relevant information in the training of ship captains who study at the ULL Nautical Engineering School.

In 2017, Aguilar de Soto coauthored a study on the family of beaked whales (Ziphiidae). It includes the first known underwater video recording of living True's beaked whales (Mesoplodon mirus), one of the least known and rarely seen beaked whales in the world. The recording was made off the coast of the Azores from a small inflatable boat as part of the Master Mind student program. The teacher and students did not recognize the species or realize that it was a historical first. The presence of True's beaked whales in the footage was later confirmed by Aguilar de Soto.

Awards and honors
 2018, Award for outstanding female researchers, Instituto Universitario de Estudios de las Mujeres (IUEM), University of La Laguna

Selected publications
 
 
 
 
 
 
 
 
 
 Aguilar de Soto, N. (2006). Comportamiento Acústico y de Buceo del Calderón Globicephala macrorhynchus y del Zifio de Blainville Mesoplodon Densirostris en las Islas Canarias. Implicaciones Sobre los Efectos del Ruido Antrópico y Las Colisiones con Embarcaciones. Ph.D. thesis. San Cristóbal de La Laguna: Universidad de La Laguna.

References

Living people
Articles containing video clips
University of La Laguna alumni
Academic staff of the University of La Laguna
Spanish marine biologists
Spanish oceanographers
Women marine biologists
Women environmentalists
Women oceanographers
21st-century Spanish women
Spanish women scientists
Year of birth missing (living people)